NCK-interacting protein with SH3 domain is a protein that in humans is encoded by the NCKIPSD gene.

The protein encoded by this gene is localized exclusively in the cell nucleus. It plays a role in signal transduction, and may function in the maintenance of sarcomeres and in the assembly of myofibrils into sarcomeres. It also plays an important role in stress fiber formation. The gene is involved in therapy-related leukemia by a chromosomal translocation t(3;11)(p21;q23) that involves this gene and the myeloid/lymphoid leukemia gene. Alternative splicing occurs in this locus and two transcript variants encoding distinct isoforms have been identified.

Interactions 

NCKIPSD has been shown to interact with Grb2 and NCK1.

References

Further reading 

 
 
 
 
 
 
 
 
 
 

Human proteins